Klaus Ostwald (born 26 August 1958) is an East German former ski jumper.

Career
He won the FIS Ski Flying World Championships 1983 in Harrachov. Ostwald earned two medals in the team large hill at the FIS Nordic World Ski Championships with a silver in 1984 and a bronze in 1985. His best individual finish at the world championships was 4th in the individual large hill in 1982. His best finish at the Winter Olympics was 13th in the normal hill at Sarajevo in 1984. He also had World Cup wins.

On 18 March 1979, at the 5th Ski Flying World Championships, he tied the ski jumping world record distance at 176 metres (577 ft) on Velikanka bratov Gorišek in Planica, Yugoslavia.

World Cup

Standings

Wins

Ski jumping world record

References

External links
 

1958 births
Living people
People from Bad Elster
German male ski jumpers
Sportspeople from Saxony
Olympic ski jumpers of East Germany
Ski jumpers at the 1980 Winter Olympics
Ski jumpers at the 1984 Winter Olympics
FIS Nordic World Ski Championships medalists in ski jumping